Sociedad Deportiva Sueca is a Spanish football team based in Sueca, in the Valencian Community. Founded in 1935, it plays in Regional Preferente – Group 4, holding home matches at Camp de l'Infantil.

Season to season

31 seasons in Tercera División

References

External links
BDFutbol team profile
Fútbol Regional team profile 

Football clubs in the Valencian Community
Association football clubs established in 1935
1935 establishments in Spain